The Mayor of Bethlehem, Pennsylvania is a political position dating from 1917, arising from the merger of Borough of Bethlehem and the Borough of South Bethlehem, which came together as the city of Bethlehem, Pennsylvania. J. William Reynolds  is the current mayor having been sworn in on January 3, 2021.

Term limits
In October 1973, just before the 15th mayoral election as the city was about to elect its 6th mayor, the council voted in favor of an ordinance limiting Bethlehem mayors to two full four-year terms (in addition to a partial term as an interim mayor if applicable). The ordinance was never submitted to, or challenged by, the voters. At the time, Bethlehem was the only city in Pennsylvania outside of Philadelphia that had term limits for mayor. This ordinance was ruled illegal by the Northampton County Court shortly after and mayor Paul Marcincin, who had voted in favor of the ordinance in 1973 when he was on the city council, used the court ruling to run for a third term in 1985. However, the city council challenged the legality of his third term and the case was brought before the Pennsylvania Supreme Court which, in 1987, struck down the Northampton County Court ruling and restored the 1973 ordinance. Marcincin would step down resulting in the first interim mayor in Bethlehem's history, as well as solidifying the two term limit for mayors.

Mayors of Bethlehem

References